Kalotermes jepsoni, is a species of damp wood termite of the genus Kalotermes. It is native to India and Sri Lanka. It usually prefers to live in dead and decaying wood, but sometimes can be seen in live wood. It is a major pest of tea in Sri Lanka.

Host plants
Cupressus lindleyi 
Shorea zeylanica 
Syzygium gardneri

References

External links

Termites
Insects described in 1932
Insects of India